Matt Hunter (born 12 July 1983 in Kamloops, British Columbia) is a Canadian professional mountain biker. Matt Hunter's professional career began when he won the 2003 "Ultimate Freeride Challenge".

Instead of participating in contests or races, Matt Hunter focuses on shooting movies and photos of his rides. Two of the most popular movies in which he appears are named "Follow Me" and "Seasons".

References

External links
Matt Hunter's bio

Living people
Sportspeople from Kamloops
Canadian male cyclists
Freeride mountain bikers
1983 births
Canadian mountain bikers